The Atlanta University Center (AUC) Robert W. Woodruff Library is a library in Atlanta which serves the four members of the Atlanta University Center, the world's oldest consortium of historically black colleges and universities (Clark Atlanta University, Morehouse College, Spelman College) and the Interdenominational Theological Center. The library, constructed in 1982, is named for Robert Winship Woodruff, former CEO of the Coca Cola Company.  In 2010, the library completed a $16.2 million renovation, partly funded by donations from the Coca Cola Company.

The library is a member of ARCHE, Lyrasis, OCLC and the HBCU Library Alliance.  It is a participant in the Georgia state library network, GALILEO.  In 2016, the library won the Excellence in Academic Libraries Award from the Association of College and Research Libraries, the first HBCU to win the award.

Collections
The Archives and Special Collections department specializes in materials about the African American experience and the history of AUC schools. Collections include the Morehouse College Martin Luther King Jr. Collection and the Henry P. Slaughter collection.

References

External links

Custodian: Morehouse College Martin Luther King Jr. Collection
Archives and Special Collections at the Robert W. Woodruff Library
Digital Exhibits
RADAR: Repository of AUC Digital collections, Archives, and Research at the Robert W. Woodruff Library

Library buildings completed in 1982
Buildings and structures in Atlanta
Education in Atlanta
Libraries in Georgia (U.S. state)
University and college academic libraries in the United States
1982 establishments in Georgia (U.S. state)